The 2021 ICC Men's T20 World Cup Africa Qualifier was a cricket tournament that was played as part of qualification process for the 2022 ICC Men's T20 World Cup, during October and November 2021.

In April 2018, the International Cricket Council (ICC) granted full international status to Twenty20 men's matches played between member sides from 1 January 2019 onwards. Therefore, all the matches in the Regional Qualifiers will be played as Twenty20 Internationals (T20Is). The Africa Qualifier started with a sub-regional qualifier consisting of two groups, with the top team in each group progressing to the Regional Final. Kenya and Nigeria, the two highest ranked teams as of 1 January 2020, progressed directly to the Regional Final.

The sub-regional tournament was scheduled to take place in South Africa from 27 April to 3 May 2020; however, on 24 March 2020, the International Cricket Council (ICC) confirmed that all ICC qualifying events scheduled to take place before 30 June 2020 had been postponed due to the COVID-19 pandemic. In December 2020, the ICC updated the qualification pathway following the disruption from the pandemic. In March 2021, the sub-regional qualifiers were postponed again, with them both being moved back to October 2021. In July 2021, the Rwanda Cricket Association announced that the ICC had confirmed Rwanda as the host nation for all of the matches in the Africa Qualifier. Qualifier A matches were played at two venues in Kigali, the Gahanga International Cricket Stadium and the IPRC Cricket Ground.

Uganda finished in first place in Qualifier A to join Kenya and Nigeria in the Regional Final. Dinesh Nakrani of Uganda was named player of the series. Qualifier B was won by Tanzania, who claimed the fourth and final place in the Regional Final. Uganda won the Regional Final, winning five of their six matches, to progress to the Global Qualifiers.

Qualifier A

Squads

Points table

 advanced to the regional final

Fixtures

Qualifier B

Squads

Points table

 advanced to the regional final

Fixtures

Regional Final

Squads

Points table

 advanced to the global qualifier

Fixtures

References

External links
 Series home at ESPN Cricinfo (Sub-regional Qualifier A)
 Series home at ESPN Cricinfo (Sub-regional Qualifier B)
 Series home at ESPN Cricinfo (Regional Finals)

Associate international cricket competitions in 2021–22
Qualifiers
ICC Men's T20 World Cup Africa Qualifier
ICC
ICC